Mehmet Ali Nuroğlu (born 7 September 1979) is a Turkish actor.

Born in Istanbul, his family is originally from Şanlıurfa. After studying philosophy for three years at Middle East Technical University, Nuroğlu enrolled in Hacettepe University to study theatre. While still studying, he started working for the Turkish State Theatres. Meanwhile, he worked as an assistant for actor Semih Sergen. In order to get a role in Çağan Irmak's period drama series Çemberimde Gül Oya, he moved to Istanbul and portrayed the character of Mehmet. He later starred in the movie Zincirbozan, portraying the character of an Idealist called Reis. He then joined the cast of Kırık Kanatlar, a TV series on Turkish War of Independence.

Filmography

Television

Film

References

External links 
 

1979 births
Turkish male film actors
Turkish male television actors
Turkish male stage actors
Living people
Hacettepe University Ankara State Conservatory alumni
Male actors from Istanbul